Solid Steel Presents Amon Tobin: Recorded Live is an album by drum and bass artist Amon Tobin mixed live using the Final Scratch software. It was recorded live, as the title suggests, in Melbourne, Australia during 2003 for Ninja Tune's Solid Steel radio series. The European version of the album was first released in June 2004 and then the US version later in September. Track listings vary on the US version.

There exist radio directors cut mixes which includes all the songs which could not be used on the album due to licence problems.

Track listing
 Intro - Amon Tobin
 Chronic Tronic - Amon Tobin / Dark Lady - DJ Food
 Twister - Tipper
 Verbal - Amon Tobin
 Remix By AFX - AFX
 Got Numb - Mob Nation
 Pressure Cooker - Cherrystones
 Soul Soul Soul - As One
 Science Fu (part 1) - Danny Breaks
 Marine Machines - Amon Tobin
 Interlude - You's A Jaco Pastorius Looking Motherfucker
 Schmalla - Facs & Scythe
 Couger Merkin - Amon Tobin
 Higher Rates - Silent Witness & Break
 Cuba (Original) - T Power
 Moon Palace - Icarus
 Reactionary - Controller 7
 Nakatali - Topogigio
 Yasawas - Amon Tobin / Night Life - Amon Tobin / Fear - Amon Tobin
 Escape - Amon Tobin / Deep Impact - Future Prophecies
 Spanner in the Worx - Exile
 Allergic - Deep Roots
 Completely Real - Suspicious Circumstance
 Total Recall - Silent Witness & Break
 Sittin Here - Dizzee Rascal
 Proper Hoodidge - Amon Tobin
 Four Ton Mantis - Amon Tobin / Hey Blondie - Amon Tobin
 Venus in Furs - The Velvet Underground

References

Amon Tobin albums
DJ mix albums
2004 live albums
Ninja Tune live albums
Ninja Tune compilation albums